The women's 400 metres event at the 2007 Asian Athletics Championships was held in Amman, Jordan on July 26–27.

Medalists

Results

Heats

Final

References
Heats results
Final results

2007 Asian Athletics Championships
400 metres at the Asian Athletics Championships
2007 in women's athletics